News Media Corporation (NMC) is an America family-owned newspaper corporation that publishes 65 different newspaper titles in eight states across the United States. Currently, it operates in smaller cities and towns with populations between 5,000 and 50,000. NMC operates in the states of Arizona, Colorado, Illinois, Nebraska, Oregon, South Dakota, West Virginia, and Wyoming.

History
News Media Corporation (NMC) was founded in 1975 by John C. Tompkins.

In 2012, NMC created a new strategic business unit called News Media Digital, which is responsible for the organization's digital marketing and advertising ventures.

People

In August 2018, Nick Monico joined NMC as President and John C. Tompkins was named Chairman. Before joining NMC, Monico was Chief Operations Officer of Wick Communications, vice president of community publishing for GateHouse Media, vice president/COO and chief strategic officer for Trib Total Media in Pittsburgh, president of Gannett Media Network of Central Ohio and COO of Thomson Newspapers’ Chicago and Kansas City divisions.

Nick left News Media Corporation in October 2019 and John Shank was promoted to Chief Operating Officer. Shank, who has worked his entire 31-year multimedia publishing career with NMC, is based in Rochelle and will oversee the company’s entire operation, while continuing on in a dual role as Illinois group publisher.

Atascadero News controversy
In 2015, a lawyer for News Media Corporation sent a cease and desist letter to the owner of an online news site also titled Atascadero News, claiming trademark infringement (NMC publishes a paper with the same name). The letter demanded that the owner stop using the name and a similar Twitter handle. The owner of the news site then changed the name to A-Town Daily News, referencing the town’s commonly used nickname.

Publications

Arizona 
 Gateway to Canyon Country, Page, AZ
 Lake Powell Chronicle, Page, AZ
 Arizona Silver Belt, Globe, AZ
 Copper Country, Globe, Az

Colorado 
 Center Post Dispatch, Center, CO
 Conejos County Citizen, La Jara, CO
 Del Norte Prospector, Del Norte, CO
 Mineral County Miner, Creede, CO
 Monte Vista Journal, Monte Vista, CO
 SLV Lifestyles, TMC, Monte Vista, CO
 South Fork Times, South Fork, CO
 Valley Courier, Alamosa, CO

Illinois 
 Ashton Gazette, Ashton, IL
 Clinton Daily Journal, Clinton, IL
 Mendota Reporter, Mendota, IL
 Mendota Reporter Money Saver, Mendota, IL
 Ogle County Life, Oregon, IL
 Rochelle News-Leader, Rochelle, IL
 Rochelle Shopping News, Rochelle, IL
 The DeWitt County Advertiser, Clinton, IL
 Amboy News, Amboy, IL

Nebraska 
 Business Farmer, Scottsbluff, NE

Oregon 
 Coast Classifieds, Newport, OR
 Cottage Grove Sentinel, Cottage Grove, OR
 Newport Coast On Over, Newport, OR
 Newport News-Times, Newport, OR
 Siuslaw News, Florence, OR
 South Lincoln County News, Waldport, OR
 This Week - South Lincoln County, Newport, OR
 This Week - North Lincoln County, Newport, OR

South Dakota 
 Brookings Profile, Brookings, SD
 Brookings Register, Brookings, SD
 Huron Plainsman, Huron, SD
 Moody County Enterprise, Flandreau, SD
 PayDay, Huron, SD
 Redfield Press, Redfield, SD

West Virginia 
 Barbour County Value Guide, Grafton, WV
 Lewis County Value Guide, Buckhannon, WV
 Mountain Statesman, Grafton, WV
 Taylor County Value Guide, Grafton, WV
 The Record Delta, Buckhannon, WV
 Upshur County Value Guide, Buckhannon, WV

Wyoming 
 Bridger Valley Pioneer, Lyman, WY
 Guernsey Gazette, Guernsey, WY
 Kemmerer Gazette, Kemmerer, WY
 Lingle Guide, Lingle, WY
 Lusk Herald, Lusk, WY
 Pinedale Roundup, Pinedale, WY
 Platte County Merchant, Wheatland, WY
 Record Times, Wheatland, WY
 Roughneck, Pinedale, WY
 Sublette Examiner, Pinedale, WY
 The Daily Telegram, Torrington, WY
 Torrington Telegram, Torrington, WY
 Uinta County Herald, Evanston, WY
 Warren Sentinel, Cheyenne, WY

References

Newspaper companies of the United States
Publishing companies established in 1975
American companies established in 1975